The Trinidad and Tobago Karate Union (TTKU) is the National Governing Body for the sport of Karate in Trinidad and Tobago.
The TTKU is affiliated to the World Karate Federation (WKF) which is the only world karate organization recognised by the International Olympic Committee.

Founding member clubs
Wesley D. Shim - IKDTT (TKA)

Neville Mason - S.K.I.F.T.T.

Anthony Sydney - GKD

Cosmos Simpson - TTSKD

Zaid Mohammed - JKO Trinidad

Selwyn TomPack - UWI Karate Club

TTKU member clubs

UWI Karate Club - Selwyn Tompack

Trinidad Assosciated Schools of Karate (TASK) - Anthony Peters

Tobago Shotokan Karate Club (TSKC) - Arthur Morris

Trinity Almighty Karatekas (TAK) - Simeon Stanisclaus

Kachi Make - Curtis Carrera

Shotokan Karate International Federation of Trinidad & Tobago (S.K.I.F.T.T.) - Neville Mason

OSKK - Cuthbert Hicks

Taekajudo Martial Arts Academy (TMAA) - Junior Codrington

Trinidad and Tobago Shotokan Karate Dojo (TTSKD) - Cosmos Simpsom

Japan Shotokan Karate Association of Trinidad & Tobago (JSKA-TT) Ricardo Wooding

International Karate Daigaku of Trinidad & Tobago (TKA) - Wesley Dexter Shim

International Shotokan Karate Federation Trinidad & Tobago (ISKF-TT) - Michael Alexander

Kanazawa Shotokan Karate International Federation - (KSKIF)  Andrew Patrick

Shuko-Kai International Trinidad & Tobago - Archie Leiba

Shotokan Karate Kobudo Kai - Rae Johnson

Trinidad and Tobago Sport Martial Arts Elite (Team Elite Karate) - Barry Winter

International competition
The TTKU since its inception has fielded formidable international competitors. In 2001, Trinidad hosted the PKF Pan American Junior Championships with 2 athletes, Richard Djerf and Brendon Strong winning gold in kumite. Strong also won a silver medal in kumite at the Pan American Senior Championships in 2005.

In 2006 TTKU won its first medal for karate at the Central American and Caribbean Games in the women's team kata, capturing a bronze medal. In the 2010 games a silver was captured by Kwame Kinsale in the +84 kg kumite division which then qualified him for the Pan American Games in 2011, a first for Trinidad and Tobago karate.

In 2011 Trinidad amassed a total of 10 medals at the Central American and Caribbean Karate Federation Championships in Barbados. That same year, Zachary Alexander represented Trinidad at the Welsh Open winning a bronze medal in adult male kata.

References

External links
http://ttkarateunion.webs.com/apps/blog/
http://www.ttoc.org/index.php?option=com_content&view=article&id=1044:trinidad-and-tobago-karate-union&catid=95:karate&Itemid=197
http://msya.gov.tt/home/index.php?option=com_content&task=view&id=61&Itemid=154

Karate organizations
Shotokan
Karate in Trinidad and Tobago